Randy Stephen Pierce (born November 23, 1957) is a Canadian former professional ice hockey winger who played in the National Hockey League (NHL) from 1977 to 1985. Pierce was later named head coach of the Kanata Stallions of the Central Canada Hockey League on July 7, 2011. Pierce was born in Arnprior, Ontario.

Career statistics

References

External links

1957 births
Living people
Binghamton Whalers players
Canadian expatriate ice hockey players in the United States
Canadian ice hockey right wingers
Colorado Rockies (NHL) draft picks
Colorado Rockies (NHL) players
Fort Worth Texans players
Hampton Gulls (AHL) players
Hartford Whalers players
Ice hockey people from Ontario
New England Whalers draft picks
New Jersey Devils players
People from Arnprior, Ontario
Philadelphia Firebirds (AHL) players
Phoenix Roadrunners (CHL) players
Salt Lake Golden Eagles (IHL) players
Sudbury Wolves players
Wichita Wind players